Fulton County is a county located in the U.S. state of Ohio west of Toledo. As of the 2020 census, the population was 42,713. Its county seat and largest city is Wauseon. The county was created in 1850 with land from Henry, Lucas, and Williams counties and is named for Robert Fulton, inventor of the steamboat. Fulton County is a part of the Toledo/ Lucas County statistical area.

History

The first seat of justice in Fulton County was Ottokee, located there because of its central location in the county. A wooden courthouse was built in 1851.

However, a railroad was built further south. Wauseon sprung up in 1854 when the railroad was extended to that point, and incorporated in 1859. With the commercial success that the railroad brought to Wauseon, the citizens of the county voted to move the county seat to Wauseon in 1871. The Fulton County Courthouse was built in 1872.

Geography

Adjacent counties
 Lenawee County, Michigan (north)
 Lucas County (east)
 Henry County (south)
 Williams County (west)
 Hillsdale County, Michigan (northwest)

Protected Areas
 Fulton Pond Wildlife Area
 Goll Woods State Nature Preserve
 Harrison Lake State Park
 Maumee State Forest
 Tiffin River Wildlife Area
 Wabash Cannonball Trail

Demographics

2000 census
As of the census of 2000, there were 42,084 people, 15,480 households, and 11,687 families living in the county. The population density was 104 people per square mile (40/km2). There were 16,232 housing units at an average density of 40 per square mile (15/km2). The racial makeup of the county was 95.65% White, 0.24% Black or African American, 0.26% Native American, 0.42% Asian, 0.04% Pacific Islander, 2.31% from other races, and 1.08% from two or more races. 5.76% of the population were Hispanic or Latino of any race.

There were 15,480 households, out of which 37.10% had children under the age of 18 living with them, 63.20% were married couples living together, 8.20% had a female householder with no husband present, and 24.50% were non-families. 21.10% of all households were made up of individuals, and 9.40% had someone living alone who was 65 years of age or older. The average household size was 2.69 and the average family size was 3.13.

In the county, the population was spread out, with 28.30% under the age of 18, 7.70% from 18 to 24, 28.70% from 25 to 44, 22.60% from 45 to 64, and 12.70% who were 65 years of age or older. The median age was 36 years. For every 100 females there were 95.60 males. For every 100 females age 18 and over, there were 93.30 males.

The median income for a household in the county was $44,074, and the median income for a family was $50,952. Males had a median income of $36,180 versus $25,137 for females. The per capita income for the county was $18,999. About 4.00% of families and 5.40% of the population were below the poverty line, including 6.10% of those under age 18 and 4.60% of those age 65 or over.

2010 census
As of the 2010 United States Census, there were 42,698 people, 16,188 households, and 11,942 families living in the county. The racial makeup of the county was 94.9% white, 0.4% black or African American, 0.4% Asian, 0.3% American Indian, 2.4% from other races, and 1.5% from two or more races. Those of Hispanic or Latino origin made up 7.8% of the population. In terms of ancestry, 45.5% were German, 11.9% were Irish, 10.7% were English, 6.9% were Polish, and 6.2% were American.

Of the 16,188 households, 34.6% had children under the age of 18 living with them, 59.8% were married couples living together, 9.3% had a female householder with no husband present, 26.2% were non-families, and 22.3% of all households were made up of individuals. The average household size was 2.61 and the average family size was 3.05. The median age was 39.9 years.

The median income for a household in the county was $50,717 and the median income for a family was $59,090. Males had a median income of $42,561 versus $30,070 for females. The per capita income for the county was $22,804. About 8.5% of families and 10.5% of the population were below the poverty line, including 14.4% of those under age 18 and 5.4% of those age 65 or over.

Politics
For over 80 years, Fulton County has regularly voted for Republican candidates for president. The only Democrats to win Fulton were Franklin Pierce in 1852 and Franklin D. Roosevelt in his 1932 election.

|}

Transportation

Airport
Fulton County Airport is a public use airport located four nautical miles (5 mi, 7 km) north of the central business district of Wauseon, Ohio. It is owned by the Fulton County Commissioners.

Highways

  Ohio Turnpike

Communities

City
 Wauseon (county seat)

Villages
 Archbold
 Delta
 Fayette
 Lyons
 Metamora
 Swanton

Townships

 Amboy
 Chesterfield
 Clinton
 Dover
 Franklin
 Fulton
 German
 Gorham
 Pike
 Royalton
 Swan Creek
 York

https://web.archive.org/web/20160715023447/http://www.ohiotownships.org/township-websites

Census-designated places
 Pettisville
 Tedrow

Unincorporated communities
 Advance
 Ai
 Assumption
 Burlington
 Denson
 Elmira
 Inlet
 Lytton
 Oakshade
 Ottokee
 Winameg

See also
 National Register of Historic Places listings in Fulton County, Ohio

References

External links
 Fulton County Government's website

 
1850 establishments in Ohio
Populated places established in 1850